USS Viper may refer to the following ships operated by the United States Navy:

  was originally the cutter Ferret but was re-rigged as a brig and renamed just before the War of 1812, during which she was captured by the British.
  was a galley hastily built and commissioned for use against the British on Lake Champlain during the War of 1812.
 , a B-class submarine originally named Viper and later renamed B-1.

United States Navy ship names